Ronny Jesús Maza Miranda (born 11 May 1997) is a Venezuelan professional footballer who plays as a forward for Canadian club Valour FC.

Early life
Maza was born in the city of Maracaibo in Venezuela's Zulia state.

Club career

Zulia
Maza began his career with Venezuelan Primera División side Zulia, and made his professional debut in 2016 while on loan with Portuguesa. During his loan, he made a total of ten appearances in league play, scoring one goal, and also scored a goal in the Copa Venezuela. 

Maza made his debut for Zulia the following season in a 2–2 draw against Deportivo Lara. On 28 April 2017, he made his continental debut in the Copa Libertadores in a 1–1 draw against Argentine side Lanús. That season, he scored three goals in twelve league appearances and made another two appearances in the Copa Venezuela. In 2018, Maza made three league appearances for Zulia before departing mid-season.

Trujillanos
In July 2018, Maza signed with nearby Primera División side Trujillanos and made seven league appearances, scoring one goal, and appeared in both of the club's playoff matches that year. The following season, Maza achieved career-highs in both goals and appearances, scoring nine in 29 appearances. He also made two appearances in the playoffs and one in the Copa Venezuela that year. In 2020, Maza scored three goals in seventeen appearances in a season shortened by the COVID-19 pandemic.

Valour FC
On 7 January 2021, Maza signed with Canadian Premier League side Valour FC.

Career statistics

References

External links

1997 births
Living people
Association football forwards
Venezuelan footballers
Sportspeople from Maracaibo
Venezuelan expatriate footballers
Expatriate soccer players in Canada
Venezuelan expatriate sportspeople in Canada
Zulia F.C. players
Portuguesa F.C. players
Trujillanos FC players
Valour FC players
Venezuelan Primera División players